Jacquelyn Ford Morie is an artist, scientist and educator working in the areas of immersive worlds, games and social networks.  Until 2013 she was a Senior Research Scientist at the Institute for Creative Technologies. In 2013 she started a spin-off company called All These Worlds, to take her work in virtual worlds and avatars to a broader audience.

Education
Morie was formally trained as an artist and medical illustrator but ultimately decided to pursue fine art.   Her Bachelor's degree in Fine Art was awarded cum laude by Florida Atlantic University in 1981.  She next received a Master's degree in Fine Art from the University of Florida in 1984, studying with noted photographer Jerry Uelsmann.

She studied computer graphics at the University of Florida, under Professor John Staudhammer and received her Masters in Computer Science from University of Florida in 1988. Morie received her PhD from SmartLab at the University of East London in 2008 in immersive environments.

Career and research
After graduation, Morie helped develop the Computer Graphic Design and Computer Animation programs at the Ringling College of Art and Design (1988–1989) .

Seeking to create new forms of artwork in the emerging field of virtual reality, Morie accepted a researcher position at the Visual System Lab (VSL) at University of Central Florida in Orlando, FL.  The VSL Lab, under the direction of J. Michael Moshell, was part of the Institute for Simulation and Training.  During her time here (1990–1994) she worked on virtual reality projects for the State of Florida and the United States Army Research Laboratory.

Together with fellow researcher Mike Goslin, Morie created a VR artwork entitled Virtopia. Virtopia debuted at the 1992 Florida Film Festival, making it the first VR Artwork to be premièred at such a venue.  It was shown in a more mature form at the 1993 Florida Film Festival and at SIGGRAPH 1994's emerging tech venue, The Edge.

From 1994 – 1997 Morie was head of Computer technical and artistic training for Walt Disney Feature Animation (WDFA).  She developed a comprehensive year-long apprenticeship for incoming computer graphic animators.  She followed this with development of similar programs for the computer graphics effects industry, at VIFX, Blue Sky Studios and Rhythm and Hues Studios.

While working at WDFA, Morie was invited to take part in a 1996 National Research Council workshop entitled Modeling and Simulation: Linking Entertainment and Defense, held at the Beckman Laser Institute in Irvine, CA.  This workshop was documented in a National Research Council publication of the same name.

The workshop led to the eventual formation of the Institute for Creative Technologies (ICT) at the University of Southern California in 1999.  In 2000, Morie joined the ICT staff as a researcher in Virtual Worlds.

Her initial work at the ICT focused on the creation of meaningful multi-sensory, virtual environments.  Two basic developments in this work included the design and use of an infrasonic floor to produce a subconscious "emotional score" for the virtual experience, and the invention of a scent collar that was patented in 2004.

Morie’s recent work is focused on extending virtual worlds into the health domain.  Her project, Coming Home at the ICT has developed several techniques that provide relation and stress relief for veterans of recent American conflicts.  Part of this work resulted in porting ICT's Virtual Human technologies to the virtual worlds Active Worlds, OpenSimulator and Second Life. This work has been featured in two 2013 documentaries: Dsknectd: We Need to Talk by Internegative Films, and The Mindfulness Movie. She has published and spoken internationally on the topics of games, immersive worlds and avatars.

In 2001 she was named one of the most creative people in America by Richard Saul Wurman in his publication: 1000: Who’s Really Who, Richard Saul Wurman’s 1000 Most Creative Individuals in the USA

References

External links
 All These Worlds website

University of Southern California staff
Living people
Alumni of the University of East London
1950 births